Karina Pérez Delgado (born October 4, 1982 in Tlaxcala) is a Mexican long-distance runner. At the 2008 Summer Olympics, she finished 61st in the women's marathon. She competed in the marathon at the 2012 Summer Olympics, placing 50th with a time of 2:33:30.

Personal bests

Achievements

References

External links

Sports reference biography

1982 births
Living people
Mexican female long-distance runners
Olympic athletes of Mexico
Athletes (track and field) at the 2008 Summer Olympics
Athletes (track and field) at the 2012 Summer Olympics
People from Tlaxcala City
Sportspeople from Tlaxcala
21st-century Mexican women